Tauffiq Ar Rasyid bin Johar (born 14 September 1995) is a Malaysian footballer who plays as a goalkeeper for Malaysia Super League club Negeri Sembilan.

Club career

PKNS
On 11 July 2017, Tauffiq made his debut with PKNS playing against Penang that end up PKNS won by 0–2.

Selangor
In 2019, he joined Selangor. Spent three seasons in Selangor as a squad player. He has decided to leave Selangor and has joined Sarawak in 2022.

Sarawak
In Sarawak he started by being the second goalkeeper who often gave competition to Sarawak's main goalkeeper at the time, Sharbinee Allawee . Then he was trusted by the Sarawak coach to be the main goalkeeper. He has played 12 games out of 26 overall in 2022.

Negeri Sembilan
He was officially announced as a new Negeri Sembilan player on January 10, 2023.

References

External links
 

Malaysian footballers
Malaysia international footballers
Malaysia Super League players
PKNS F.C. players
Negeri Sembilan FC players
Living people
1995 births
Association football goalkeepers
People from Selangor
Malaysian people of Malay descent